Fate/stay night: Heaven's Feel III. spring song is a 2020 Japanese anime fantasy film produced by ufotable and directed by Tomonori Sudō.

The story continues immediately from the events of Fate/stay night: Heaven's Feel II. lost butterfly, and is the final installment in a trilogy of films adapting Heaven's Feel, the third and final route of the visual novel Fate/stay night. It premiered in Japan on August 15, 2020, and in the United States on November 18, 2020. Like its predecessors, the film was a commercial success, grossing over $19 million in its theatrical release.

Plot 
Following her return home, Sakura Matou fuses with the Shadow after killing her brother, Shinji, for his attempted rape. Shirou Emiya finds Shinji's body and is taunted by Zouken Matou for his role in Sakura's corruption, but Shirou is  rescued from him by Rider. Afterward, Zouken sends the corrupted Sakura to kidnap Illyasviel von Einzbern - to be a vessel for the Holy Grail like her mother was - and she attacks the Emiya household with Saber Alter; Sakura subdues her sister, Rin Tohsaka, and Illya surrenders to save everyone. Although bound to protect Shirou by Sakura's final command spell, Rider refuses to fight Sakura directly, so Shirou reluctantly asks Kirei Kotomine for help.

Raiding the ruined Einzbern castle, Kirei distracts Zouken and his Servant Assassin while Shirou rescues Illya, but Sakura sends a now-corrupted Berserker to chase them. Despite knowing it will eventually kill him, a desperate Shirou unseals Archer's transplanted left arm, replicating Berserker's weapon and strength with Archer's magic to defeat him. Kirei drives off Assassin by destroying Zouken's body, recalling his wish for the Grail - to satisfy his "twisted" nature. Sakura confronts Kirei and destroys his artificial heart from the last Holy Grail War, but fails to finish him off when Berserker's defeat incapacitates her.

Shirou learns from Illya and Rin that Sakura is influenced through the shadow by an evil entity known as Angra Mainyu - an Avenger-class Servant summoned by the Einzbern family in a prior war. Seeking to subdue Sakura before she gives birth to Angra Mainyu, Rin and Illya combine their abilities to show Shirou their family's recorded memories, revealing that the Holy Grail was conceived to reach the "Root" of all knowledge. Shirou uses the visions to recreate the weapon of the oldest magus, the Jeweled Sword Zelretch, at the cost of continual damage from Archer's arm. Meanwhile, Zouken plots to make Sakura his new vessel, revealing his actual body near Sakura's heart. However, Sakura retaliates by absorbing Assassin with the Shadow before ripping Zouken out of her chest and crushing him.

After a brief confrontation, Shirou convinces Rider that he will save Sakura no matter what, securing her help along with Rin. The group arrives at Fuyuki Cave, where the tainted Grail waits, but Saber Alter bars their way and only lets Rin pass on Sakura's orders. Working together, Shirou and Rider subdue Saber Alter long enough for Shirou to kill his former Servant. Confronting Sakura, Rin uses the Jeweled Sword to cut through Sakura's shadow minions - but after Sakura professes to feeling abandoned by the world, Rin can't bring herself to kill her and is impaled while apologizing for failing as a sister. Overcome with guilt, Sakura tries sacrificing herself to stop Angra Mainyu but is stopped by Shirou; insisting they both atone by living, he projects Caster's sorcery-nullifying Rule Breaker and severs Sakura's link to The Shadow.

Despite the Shadow being purged from Sakura, Angra Mainyu still tries to emerge from the Holy Grail. Rider takes Rin and Sakura to safety while Shirou stays to destroy The Holy Grail, but a dying Kirei interferes. Shirou defeats Kirei after a vicious fistfight, the latter declaring Shirou the winner of the Holy Grail War before dying. Before Shirou can destroy the Grail at the cost of his life, Illya stops him. Revealing herself as Shirou's older sister and vowing to protect him, Illya performs the Heaven's Feel ritual to save Shirou by separating his soul from his dying body, in turn destroying the Holy Grail. As she passes on, Illya reunites with the spirit of her mother Irisviel.

In the aftermath, Rin and Sakura revive Shirou by giving his recovered soul an artificial body provided by Touko Aozaki. Resuming their relationship, Shirou and Sakura - along with Rin, Taiga, and a now-incarnated Rider - go to see the cherry blossoms as Shirou promised.

Production 
Heaven's Feel III. spring song is produced by ufotable, directed by Tomonori Sudō and written by Akira Hiyama and featuring music from Yuki Kajiura. The first visual of the film was released in October 2019. Subsequent ones were publicly distributed on October 28, 2019 and November 17, 2019. Its March 28, 2020 release date was confirmed in a trailer featuring the main theme, Aimer's .

Tomonori Sudō expressed relief when the film was released, favoriting many scenes including Rider's fight against Saber Alter, the relationship between Sakura and Rin, Illya's new design among others. The cast praised Aimer's performance for her song during the release of the movie.

Release 
The film was originally scheduled to premiere in Japan on March 28, 2020, but it was postponed to April 25, 2020, and then again to August 15, 2020, due to concerns over the COVID-19 pandemic. Aniplex of America originally planned to present a preview screening of the film in the United States on April 17, 2020, at the Orpheum Theater in Los Angeles, and to begin wider theatrical screenings across the United States starting on May 7, 2020. However, due to concerns over the pandemic, the U.S. premiere was cancelled, and all North American theatrical screenings were postponed to November 18, 2020. The film was released on DVD and Blu-ray on March 31, 2021, in Japan.

Reception
The film's opening topped the Japanese box office, 270,000 tickets sold for a gross of 474,890,600 yen ($4.48 million) in its opening weekend. The movie made 1 billion yen at the Japanese box office in 11 days, reaching the milestone quicker than the first two films, and sold a total of 620,000 tickets in that time. The film went on to earn more than 1.9 billion yen ($18 million) by October 15, 2020, in Japan, until December 31, it grossed 2 billion yen ($18.8 million) in Japan, making it the highest-grossing film in the Heaven's Feel trilogy.

The film went on to earn $682,049 in South Korea, $124,140 in Australia, $17,588 in New Zealand, $259,051 in Hong Kong, and $75,000 in Mexico.

In the United States, the film opened in 10th place at the box office, with estimated earnings of $200,000 from a limited release in 304 theaters.

References

External links 
  
 
 

2020 anime films
2020 films
Anime films based on video games
Anime films composed by Yuki Kajiura
Anime postponed due to the COVID-19 pandemic
Aniplex
Fate/stay night films
Films postponed due to the COVID-19 pandemic
Films set in 2004
Japanese animated fantasy films
Japanese fantasy films
2020s Japanese-language films
Supernatural anime and manga
Type-Moon
Ufotable